Vice Admiral  Asiel Kubu is a South African Navy officer currently serving as Chief of Human Resources for the South African National Defence Force.

He joined the Navy as a Midshipman at the South African Naval College in 1992 as one of the first black officers to attend the College. He previously served as Director of Naval Personnel and Chief of Naval Staff. He was promoted to vice admiral in 2019 and appointed Chief of Human Resources for the South African National Defence Force.

References

South African admirals
Living people
Year of birth missing (living people)